The V Velká Cena Masarykova (1934 Masaryk Grand Prix, V Masarykův okruh) was a 750 kg Formula race held on 30 September 1934 at the Masaryk Circuit.

Classification

References

Grand Prix race reports
Masaryk
Masaryk